Firas Khoury is a Palestinian film director and screenwriter. He is best known for directing the feature film Alam and short film Maradona's Legs.

Career
Firas graduated from Tel Aviv University with a BFA in Film. In 2008, he attended the Berlinale Talent Campus. He taught cinematic expression at the Freedom Theatre in Jenin Camp. He is the founder of Falastinema Group, which presents screenings and cinema activities throughout Palestine. In 2010, his short film Yellow Mums, won the Best Short Film at the Jerusalem Film Festival. His short film Maradona's Legs,  premiered at the Palm Springs International Film Festival in 2019.

Firas wrote and directed his debut feature Alam, which had its world premiere at the 2022 Toronto International Film Festival, and he won the Golden Pyramid from the Cairo International Film Festival for best film.

Filmography

As Actor
 2008 - On Any Saturday
 2011 - The Promise
 2012 - The Attack

Awards and nominations

References

External links
 

1982 births
Living people
Palestinian film directors
Palestinian male actors
Palestinian screenwriters
Tel Aviv University alumni